Cochlospermum angolense is a tree in the family Bixaceae. It is native to Angola and the Democratic Republic of the Congo. An extract of the tree's bark, called Borotutu in African traditional medicine, has been studied in mice for its potential to treat malaria.

References

angolense
Trees of Angola
Trees of the Democratic Republic of the Congo
Plants used in traditional African medicine
Plants described in 1868
Taxa named by Daniel Oliver
Taxa named by Friedrich Welwitsch